The Gardens of Vatican City, also informally known as the Vatican Gardens in Vatican City, are private urban gardens and parks which cover more than half of the country, located in the west of the territory and owned by the Pope. There are some buildings, such as Vatican Radio and the Governor's Palace, within the gardens.

Stone walls bound the area in the North, South, and West. The gardens and parks were established during the Renaissance and Baroque era and are decorated with fountains and sculptures. 
 
Pope Francis opened the Vatican Gardens to the public in 2014. Individuals and pre-formed groups, considered to consist of sixteen or more people, may visit the Gardens with the presence of a tour guide. The gardens also enshrine eighteen Marian images venerated worldwide at the designation of the Pope, who is the owner of the gardens.

History

Pious tradition claim that the foundation site of the Vatican Gardens was spread with sacred soil brought from Mount Calvary by Empress Saint Helena to symbolically unite the blood of Jesus Christ with that shed by thousands of early Christians, who died in the persecutions of Emperor Nero Caesar Augustus.

The gardens date back to medieval times when orchards and vineyards extended to the north of the Papal Apostolic Palace. In 1279, Pope Nicholas III (Giovanni Gaetano Orsini, 1277–1280) moved his residence back to the Vatican from the Lateran Palace and enclosed this area with walls. He planted an orchard (pomerium), a lawn (pratellum), and a garden (viridarium). Firstly, they appeared near the hills of Sant'Egidio where today the Palazzetto del Belvedere and the Courtyards of the Vatican Museums are located.

The site received a major re-landscaping at the beginning of the 16th century, during the pontificate of Pope Julius II. Donato Bramante's original design was then split into three new courtyards, the Cortili del Belvedere, the "della Biblioteca" and the "della Pigna" (or Pine Cone) in the Renaissance landscape design style. Also in Renaissance style, a great rectangular Labyrinth, formal in design, set in boxwood and framed with Italian stone pines, (Pinus pinea) and cedars of Lebanon, (Cedrus libani). In place of Nicholas III's enclosure, Bramante built a great rectilinear defensive wall.

In 1921 a fire broke out inside the sanctuary of the Basilica of Loreto and destroyed a statue of the Virgin Mary, known as Our Lady of Loreto. The statue was commissioned by Pope Pius XI in 1922. It was carved from cedars of Lebanon from the Vatican Gardens. The sculpture, designed by Enrico Quattrini and painted by Leopoldo Celani, is still one of the most venerated today in the Basilica of Loreto, in the Marche region.

Since the end of 2014, the Vatican Museums and the Directorate of Technical Services of the Governorate of Vatican City State have been running the project of restoration and conservation of various stone artifacts in the gardens. The goal of the project has been to prevent the deterioration of the objects of art-historical interest.

In October 2017 the professionals involved in the restoration conducted a study to consider, from a scientific point of view, modern methods and eco-sustainable techniques in application to  the conservation of the artifacts over time. After a careful study, they opted for non-toxic and environmentally friendly products, such as oregano (Origanum vulgare) and thyme (Thymus vulgaris), along with other plant protection products used individually or combined.

There are a variety of fountains cooling the gardens, sculptures, an artificial grotto devoted to Our Lady of Lourdes, and an Olive tree donated by the government of Israel.

Both the Vatican and Castel Gandalfo gardens became open to the general public in 2014.

In 2019, Rafael Tornini, head of the Garden and Environment Service of the Vatican, announced the gardens had been transitioning to organic lawn management since 2017.

Patroness of the Gardens
Pope Pius XI designated Saint Therese of Lisieux The Little Flower as the official Patroness of the gardens on 17 May 1927, according to her the title as "Sacred Keeper of the Gardens" and within the same year, a small chapel dedicated to her was built within the gardens near the Leonine walls.

List of Marian images enshrined

The following are venerated images of the Blessed Virgin Mary enshrined at the Vatican Gardens:

Gallery

See also
 Vatican Climate Forest
 Index of Vatican City-related articles

References

Notes

Bibliography
 
 Ricci, Corrado. "Vatican: Its History Its Treasures" Contributor Ernesto Begni. copyright 2003 Published by Kessinger Publishing,

Sources
The initial version is based upon the article :it:Giardini Vaticani of the Italian language edition of Wikipedia. Data concerning the measures of lengths were taken from the article :de:Vatikanische Gärten of the German language edition of Wikipedia.

External links

 
 The Vatican: spirit and art of Christian Rome, a book from The Metropolitan Museum of Art Libraries (fully available online as PDF), which contains material on the gardens (pp. 155–164)

Geography of Vatican City
Parks in Vatican City